Uzbekistan is a nation that has competed at the Hopman Cup tournament on one occasion, in 2003. In 2003, Uzbekistan won their qualification play-off but went on to place fourth in group A.

Before its dissolution, Uzbekistan used to form part of the Soviet Union which also competed at the Hopman Cup on two occasions in the early 1990s. Additionally, Uzbekistan is a member of the CIS which entered a team into the 1992 event.

Uzbekistan also participated on one occasion in the now defunct Asian Hopman Cup, a qualifying tournament which ran from 2006 until 2009 and granted the winners entry into the Hopman Cup the following year. The nation competed in 2007 and failed to pass the round robin stage of the tournament, thus denying them entry into the main event in Australia the following year.

Players
This is a list of players who have played for Uzbekistan in the Hopman Cup.

Results

References

See also
CIS at the Hopman Cup
Soviet Union at the Hopman Cup

Hopman Cup teams
Hopman Cup
Hopman Cup